The Canton of Cloyes-sur-le-Loir is a French former canton, located in the arrondissement of Châteaudun, in the Eure-et-Loir département (Centre région). It had 9,693 inhabitants (2012). It was disbanded following the French canton reorganisation which came into effect in March 2015. It consisted of 15 communes, which joined the canton of Brou in 2015.

Municipalities
The canton comprised the following communes:

Cloyes-sur-le-Loir (seat)
 Arrou
 Autheuil
 Boisgasson
 Charray
 Châtillon-en-Dunois
 Courtalain
 Douy
 La Ferté-Villeneuil
 Langey
 Le Mée
 Montigny-le-Gannelon
 Romilly-sur-Aigre
 Saint-Hilaire-sur-Yerre
 Saint-Pellerin

See also
Cantons of the Eure-et-Loir department

References

Former cantons of Eure-et-Loir
2015 disestablishments in France
States and territories disestablished in 2015